Lee Adler may refer to:
 Lee Adler (artist) (1926–2003), American painter
 Lee Adler (preservationist) (1923–2012), American preservationist